Aurelian Pavelescu (born October 20, 1964 in Lădești, Vâlcea County, Romania) is a Romanian politician. He has been serving as the president of the Christian Democratic National Peasants' Party (PNȚCD) since 2011 onwards.

See also 

 Politics of Romania

1964 births
Living people
Leaders of political parties in Romania
People from Vâlcea County
University of Bucharest alumni
20th-century Romanian lawyers